Albert Galliton Harrison (June 26, 1800 – September 7, 1839) was a three-term United States Representative from Missouri and a slaveholder.

Biography 
Born in Mount Sterling, Kentucky, Harrison graduated from Transylvania University, Lexington, Kentucky, in 1820. He was then admitted to the bar and began his law practice in Mount Sterling. Seven years later, he moved to Fulton, Missouri.

Harrison served as member of the Board of Visitors to the United States Military Academy at West Point in 1828, and from 1829 to 1835 was a member of the commission to settle land titles growing out of Spanish grants.

Congress 
In 1832, he was elected as a Jacksonian Democratic Representative to the Twenty-fourth Congress (March 4, 1835 – March 3, 1837). Harrison was re-elected as a Democratic Representative to the Twenty-fifth and Twenty-sixth Congresses (March 4, 1837 – September 7, 1839).

Death 
Albert G. Harrison died six months into his third term in Fulton, Missouri at the age of 39 in 1839. His remains were interred in the Congressional Cemetery, Washington, D.C..

Tributes

Harrison County, Missouri is named for him, as is the town of Harrisonville in Cass County, Missouri.

See also
List of United States Congress members who died in office (1790–1899)

References

1800 births
1839 deaths
People from Mount Sterling, Kentucky
Jacksonian members of the United States House of Representatives from Missouri
Democratic Party members of the United States House of Representatives from Missouri
Kentucky lawyers
American slave owners
People from Fulton, Missouri
Transylvania University alumni
Burials at the Congressional Cemetery